Charaxes chanleri is a butterfly in the family Nymphalidae. It is found in north-central and northern Kenya and southern Ethiopia. The habitat consists of arid Acacia savanna.

Original description
In 1895, William Jacob Holland wrote:

Vingerhoedt provides images

Taxonomy
Considered conspecific with Charaxes kirki kirkii by Turlin and Vingerhoedt.

Etymology
It was named for William A. Chanler, one of the collectors.

Realm
Afrotropical realm

References

External links
African Butterfly Database Range map via search

Butterflies described in 1896
chanleri
Butterflies of Africa